
Arcoona is a pastoral lease in South Australia.

Arcoona may also refer to.

Places

Australia
Arcoona, a  pastoral lease in Western Australia
Arcoona, South Australia, a locality
Arcoona Plateau, a sub-region in the Gawler IBRA region

Elsewhere
A regio  on the asteroid, 25143 Itokawa

Ships
SS Arcoona (1924), the former name for  SS Arkaba

Common and scientific names for some Australian animals
Ctenophorus fionni, commonly known as the Arcoona Rock Dragon
Fissarena arcoona, a spider in the Genus Fissarena
Lamponega arcoona, a spider in the Genus Lamponidae
Longrita arcoona , a spider in the Genus Longrita
Wugigarra arcoona, a spider in the Genus Wugigarra

See also
Aroona (disambiguation)